How to Be a Latin Lover is a 2017 American comedy film directed by Ken Marino, written by Chris Spain and Jon Zack and stars Eugenio Derbez, Salma Hayek, Raphael Alejandro, Raquel Welch, Rob Riggle, Rob Huebel, Rob Corddry, Renée Taylor, Linda Lavin, Kristen Bell, and Rob Lowe. This was also Welch's final film before her death in 2023.  The film follows a man who has spent his whole life married to a rich old woman, and must learn to make it on his own when she kicks him out. It was released on April 28, 2017 by Pantelion Films and grossed $62.6 million worldwide.

Plot
Having made a career of seducing rich older women, Maximo marries a wealthy woman more than twice his age. 25 years later, spoiled, out of shape and bored from waking up next to his now 80-year-old wife, he gets the surprise of his life when she dumps him for a younger McLaren car salesman.

Forced out of his mansion and desperate for a place to stay, he contacts Rick, another pampered gigolo. He crashes in the upscale playhouse of the woman's granddaughter, which does not go over very well. He soon moves in with his estranged sister, Sara, and her nerdy son, Hugo, in their small apartment. During this time, two things occur:
 Anxious to return to the lap of luxury, Maximo uses his nephew's crush on classmate Arden to get to his new target: her grandmother, Celeste (a widowed billionaire that Rick is also targeting). Maximo tries to reignite his charm as a Latin lover, and fails at it miserably. Sara discovers her brother's scamming and kicks him out.
 While teaching Hugo some tricks he thinks work on women, Maximo finds himself bonding with his nephew, and this opens his heart to being less selfish and more thoughtful of others.

Eventually, Maximo becomes a gigolo for the woman Rick used to live with, and he patches up the relationship with his sister and nephew.

Cast
Eugenio Derbez as Maximo
Noel Carabaza as Young Maximo
Vadhir Derbez as 21 year old Maximo
Salma Hayek as Sara, Maximo's estranged sister
Manelly Zepeda as Young Sara
Raphael Alejandro as Hugo, Sara's nerdy and adorable son and Maximo's nephew.
Rob Lowe as Rick the Gigolo, Maximo's equally wealthy friend.
Kristen Bell as Cindy, a lonely and single woman, who works at a frozen yogurt shop and lives alone with her dozens of cats.
Raquel Welch as Celeste Birch, Maximo's target and Arden's grandmother, whom Maximo tries to seduce in order to live a life of luxury once again. This was Welch's final film role before her death in 2023.
Linda Lavin as Millicent Dupont, the wealthy woman whose gigolo Maximo finally becomes
Renée Taylor as Peggy, Maximo's wealthy, but elderly, wife. She leaves Maximo for an unattractive and younger car salesman.
Rob Riggle as Scott
Rob Huebel as Nick
Rob Corddry as Quincy, Celeste's chauffeur
Mckenna Grace as Arden, Hugo's crush.
Mather Zickel as James, Sara's neighbor and love interest
Michaela Watkins as Gwen, Sara's boss
Michael Cera as Remy, a sleazebag car salesman
"Weird Al" Yankovic as himself
Ben Schwartz as Jimmy
Jeffrey Scott Basham as Valet
Omar Chaparro as Rafa
José Eduardo Derbez as Drink Waiter

Production
On June 5, 2015, it was announced that Eugenio Derbez and Benjamin Odell's Santa Monica-based production shingle 3Pas Studios and Televisa/Lionsgate joint venture Pantelion Films had bought an untitled original comedy script from Chris Spain and Jon Zack, with Lionsgate releasing under its first look deal. On October 26, 2015, Ken Marino was attached to direct the film, starring Derbez. On April 28, 2016, Rob Lowe, Kristen Bell, Raquel Welch and Rob Riggle joined the film's cast along with others including Renée Taylor, Rob Huebel, Michaela Watkins and Linda Lavin. On May 11, 2016, Mckenna Grace joined the cast.

Release
The first trailer was released on December 21, 2016. The film was released on April 28, 2017 by Lionsgate's Pantelion Films.

Box office
How to Be a Latin Lover has grossed $32.1 million in the United States and Canada and $30.4 million in other territories for a worldwide total of $62.6 million, against a production budget of $10–13 million.

In North America, the film was released alongside The Circle, Sleight and Baahubali 2: The Conclusion, and was projected to gross about $7 million from 1,118 theaters in its opening weekend. The film ended up grossing $3.9 million on its first day and $12.3 million over the weekend, finishing second at the box office behind The Fate of the Furious. 89% of the opening weekend audience was Hispanic. The film grossed $5.1 million in its second weekend (a drop of 58%) and $3.9 million in its third (dropping just 25%), finishing 4th and 7th, respectively.

Critical response
On Rotten Tomatoes, the film has an approval rating of 39% based on 31 reviews, with an average rating of 4.8/10. The website's consensus reads, "How to be a Latin Lover inspires a few laughs from its talented ensemble, but it raises the question: Is bad representation better than no representation?" On Metacritic the film has a score 54 out of 100, based on 11 critics, indicating "mixed or average reviews". Audiences polled by CinemaScore gave the film an average grade of "A" on an A+ to F scale.

Joe Leydon of Variety wrote: "There are some very funny bits and pieces scattered amid the proceedings, along with a few darkly comical gags that appear to belong in a different movie, but are more than welcome here."

Home media
How to be a Latin Lover was released on Digital HD on August 1, 2017, and was released two weeks later on Blu-ray and DVD on August 15, 2017.

Acapulco

Remake
A French remake entitled  (Just a Gigolo in French-speaking markets) was released in April 2019. The film was directed by Olivier Baroux, co-written by Baroux and Kad Merad, and stars Merad, Anne Charrier, Pascal Elbé and Thierry Lhermitte among others.

References

External links

2017 romantic comedy films
2010s Spanish-language films
American romantic comedy films
Films shot in California
Films set in California
Lionsgate films
2017 directorial debut films
Hispanic and Latino American films
Hispanic and Latino American comedy films
2010s English-language films
2010s American films